There have been two baronetcies created for persons with the surname Bateson, one in the Baronetage of Ireland and one in the Baronetage of the United Kingdom.

The Bateson-Harvey, later Bateson Baronetcy, of Killoquin in the County of Antrim, was created in the Baronetage of Ireland on 26 August 1789 for Robert Bateson-Harvey, with remainder to the heirs male of his father Richard Bateson. Born Robert Bateson, he assumed by Royal licence the additional surname of Hervey in 1788 (which was that of his maternal grandfather). He died without legitimate issue and was succeeded according to the special remainder by his nephew, the second Baronet. He was the son of Thomas Bateson, the son from his father's first marriage. He notably served as High Sheriff of Donegal in 1822. However, he was childless and on his death in 1870 the baronetcy became extinct.

Robert Harvey, illegitimate son of the first Baronet, was the father of Robert Harvey, who was created a baronet in 1868 (see Harvey baronets).

The Bateson, later de Yarburgh-Bateson Baronetcy, of Belvoir Park in the County of Down, was created in the Baronetage of the United Kingdom on 18 December 1818. For more information on this creation, see the Baron Deramore.

Bateson-Harvey, later Bateson baronets, of Killoquin (1789)
Sir Robert Bateson-Harvey, 1st Baronet (died 1825)
Sir Robert Bateson, 2nd Baronet (–1870)

Bateson, later de Yarburgh-Bateson baronets, of Belvoir Park (1818)
see Baron Deramore

References

Extinct baronetcies in the Baronetage of Ireland
Extinct baronetcies in the Baronetage of the United Kingdom
Baronetcies created with special remainders